The Sheriff of Stirling was historically the office responsible for enforcing law and order in Stirling, Scotland and bringing criminals to justice. Prior to 1748 most sheriffdoms were held on a hereditary basis. From that date, following the Jacobite uprising of 1745, the hereditary sheriffs were replaced by salaried sheriff-deputes, qualified advocates who were members of the Scottish Bar.

Following mergers of the Scottish sheriffdoms the office became the Sheriff of Stirling & Dumbarton in 1871  and the Sheriff of Stirling, Dumbarton & Clackmannan in 1881.

The sheriffdom was dissolved in 1975 when the current sheriffdoms of North Strathclyde and Tayside, Central and Fife were created.

Sheriffs of Stirling

William Fitz Thorald (c.1130)
Dufoter (1153)
Gilbert de Stirling (1170)
Alexander de Stirling (1189, 1195–1198, 1219)
Muireadhach II, Earl of Menteith (1226)
John de Stirling (1230) 
Bernard Fraser (1226-1233)
Alexander de Stirling (1235) 
John de Stirling (1241)
Gilbert Fraser (1258)
John Lamberton (1265-1266)
Patrick de Graham (1288-1289)
Andrew Fraser (1291-1293)
David Grant (1295-1296)
Richard Waldgrave (1296)
Alexander Livingstone (1304)
William Bisset (1304-1305)
Alexander Fraser (1328)
Richard Lachlan - 1328 - Deputy
Richard Lachlan (1329)
Robert Erskine (1360)
Andrew Murray (1367)
Thomas Erskine (1367)
Walter Oliphant (1368)
Thomas, Earl of Mar (1368)
Robert de Normanville (1373)
John Stewart (1407)
John Seton, 2nd Lord Seton (1436)
Malcolm Fleming (1470)
Alexander Bruce - 1470 - Deputy
Janes Schaw of Sanchie (1473)
Alexander Seton (1488)

Sheriffs-Depute of Stirling and Clackmannan (1748)
 David Walker, 1748–1761 
 Robert Bruce, 1761–1764  
 George Cockburn (later Haldane), 1764–1770 
Alexander Abercromby, Lord Abercromby, 1770–1780  
John Pringle, 1780–1790  
William Tait, 1790–1797  
David Williamson, 1797–1807

Sheriffs-Depute of Stirling (1807)
1807 - Stirling separated from Clackmannan
David Williamson, 1807–1811 
Ranald Macdonald of Staffa, 1811–1838
John Shaw Stewart, 1839–1840
Robert Handyside, 1840–1853 
Charles Baillie, 1853–1858
George Moir, 1858–1868 
Robert Bogle Blackburn, 1868–1871

Sheriffs of Stirling and Dumbarton (1871)
Robert Bogle Blackburn, 1871–1875

Sheriffs of Stirling, Dumbarton and Clackmannan (1881)
 James Muirhead, 1885–1889
 Alexander Blair, 1889–1891 
 John Mckie Lees, 1891–1917 
 James Robert Nicolson Macphail, 1917–1933 
 Sir Archibald Campbell Black, 1933–1937  (Sheriff of Lanark, 1937)
 John Charles Fenton, 1937–1942  (Sheriff of the Lothians and Peebles, 1942) 
 Sir Robert Henry Maconochie, 1942–1961 
 Francis Clifford Watt, QC, 1961–1971  
 Robert Richardson Taylor, 1971–1975  (Sheriff Principal of Tayside, Central and Fife, 1975)

 In 1975 the sheriffdom was largely merged into the current sheriffdom of Tayside, Central and Fife.

See also
 Historical development of Scottish sheriffdoms

References

Stirling (city)